Polysilicone-15 (INCI) is an organic compound used in hair products like shampoos, conditioners, hair sprays, pomades and color treatment products to absorb UVB radiation. In the EU, it is also approved for use in sunscreens and cosmetics. The absorption maximum is at about 310 nm. It is marketed as Parsol SLX by DSM.

The backbone chain is mainly composed of siloxane repeat units, and is of low molecular weight, so being classed as an oligomer.

References
Parsol SLX

Silicones
Sunscreening agents
Siloxanes